Song of Humanity is an album by American jazz trumpeter Wadada Leo Smith with the ensemble New Dalta Akhri, which was recorded live at The Gallery, New Haven, and released in 1977 on his own Kabell label. The album was reissued in 2004 as part of the four-CD box Kabell Years: 1971-1979 on John Zorn's imprint Tzadik.

Reception

In his review for AllMusic, Eugene Chadbourne states "This, the one existing album of this group, suffers from a syndrome of the time being too short to allow stretching out if it is to include a few different styles of compositions by each writing member of the group, which, in this case, included not only Smith but pianist Anthony Davis."

Track listing
All compositions by Wadada Leo Smith except where noted.
 "Song of Humanity" - 5:13
 "Lexicon" (Anthony Davis) - 7:40
 "Peacocks, Gazelles, Dogwood Trees & Six Silver Coins" - 8:30
 "Of Blues and Dreams" (Anthony Davis) - 11:03
 "Pneuma" - 1:34
 "Tempio" - 6:59

Personnel
Wadada Leo Smith - trumpet, flugelhorn, sealhorn, atenteben, steel-o-phone, percussion
Oliver Lake - flute, soprano sax, alto sax, marimba, percussion 
Anthony Davis - piano, electric piano, organ
 Wes Brown - bass, atenteben, odurogyabe
Pheeroan AkLaff - drums, percussion

References

1977 live albums
Wadada Leo Smith live albums